Hayes-Roth is a surname. Notable people with the surname include:

 Barbara Hayes-Roth, American computer scientist
 Rick Hayes-Roth (born 1947), American computer scientist

Compound surnames